The 2018–19 2. Bundesliga was the 45th season of the 2. Bundesliga. It began on 3 August 2018 and concluded on 19 May 2019.

1. FC Köln and SC Paderborn were automatically promoted to the Bundesliga; Union Berlin were promoted after winning the Bundesliga relegation play-offs. 1. FC Magdeburg and MSV Duisburg were automatically relegated to the 3. Liga, while FC Ingolstadt 04 were also relegated to the 3. Liga after losing a playoff against SV Wehen Wiesbaden of that league.

Season

Promotion Battle
Before the start of the season, Bundesliga relegations 1. FC Köln and Hamburger SV were considered the biggest favourites for promotion. In the first round, both fulfilled this role: Hamburger SV was able to get just ahead of Herbstmeister, 1. FC Union Berlin followed after a round without defeat, including 10 draws, in third place. While FC St. Pauli, 1. FC Heidenheim and Holstein Kiel were gradually eliminated from the field of the chasers, the newly promoted SC Paderborn 07 advanced to the promotion places thanks to a strong back-series (1st place with 32 points in the back-round table). After 32 days of play, Köln was crowned 2. Bundesliga champion for the fourth time and celebrated the re-entry into the Bundesliga; in the end, Köln recorded the most victories and scored the most goals. Hamburger SV, on the other hand, played a disastrous return round (15th place with 19 points in the back-round table), which finally resulted in the missed re-emergence one match day before the end; the fight for second place became a long-distance duel between Paderborn and Union Berlin on the last day of the match. In the end, Paderborn managed to make it to the Bundesliga on the last day of the season despite a 1-3 defeat in Dresden, Union Berlin finished third in the standings and competed in the promotion delegation against VfB Stuttgart. After a 2-2 draw in Stuttgart and a 0-0 draw at home, Union Berlin moved up to the Bundesliga for the first time thanks to the away goals rule.

Relegation battle
After the first promotion to the 2. Bundesliga, 1. FC Magdeburg had a first appearance with the direct relegation, which was fixed on the 33rd match day. In addition to Magdeburg, MSV Duisburg was also relegated after only two seasons in the second-class. On the last day of the match, SV Sandhausen secured direct class position with a 2-2 draw at SSV Jahn Regensburg, FC Ingolstadt 04 closed the season on the 16th place in the table after a 2-4 defeat in Heidenheim and competed in the relegation delegation against SV Wehen Wiesbaden. After a 2-1 in Wiesbaden, Ingolstadt lost in the home game with 2:3 and was relegated to the 3rd league due to the away goals rule.

Teams

Team changes

Stadiums and locations

Personnel and kits

Managerial changes

League table

Results

Promotion play-offs

Relegation play-offs
All times are CEST (UTC+2).

First leg

Second leg

4–4 on aggregate. Wehen Wiesbaden won on away goals and are promoted to the 2. Bundesliga, while FC Ingolstadt are relegated to the 3. Liga.

Top scorers

Number of teams by state

Highs of the season
 The highest victory with seven goals difference was the 8:1 of the 1. FC Köln against Dynamo Dresden on the 13th matchday, which with nine goals was also the most goal-rich game.
 The most goal-scoring draws were with eight goals:
 the 4:4 of SC Paderborn 07 against 1. FC Magdeburg on the 6th matchday
 the 4:4 of SC Paderborn 07 against Holstein Kiel on the 13th matchday
 the 4:4 of MSV Duisburg against 1. FC Köln on the 26th matchday
 The most goal-scoring matchday was the 26th matchday from 15 to 18 March and 10 April 2019 with 38 goals.
 1. FC Union Berlin remained the only team in German professional football in the 2018–19 season undefeated in 17 consecutive games.

Useful Information
 With the first relegations of Hamburger SV from the Bundesliga in the pre-season, two Hamburg city derbies between Hamburger SV and FC St. Pauli took place for the first time this season in the 2. Bundesliga and again since the 2010–11 Bundesliga two Hamburg city derbies. In the first local derby, the Hamburger SV had the home right, the game ended 0-0. The return match at FC St. Pauli on 10 March 2019 was won 4-0 by Hamburger SV.
 In June 2018, the 2. Bundesliga relegations Eintracht Braunschweig and 1. FC Kaiserslautern received a commitment of a supporting donation of €600,000. Each club of the 2017–18 2. Bundesliga season had paid €66,666 into a pot independently of the DFL in order to make it easier for the two former 2. Bundesliga teams to make a fresh start in the 3. Liga. This was already decided in April, as the majority of the clubs were still involved in the relegation fight until shortly before the end of the season.
 On the 11th matchday, two former European Cup winners met for the first time in the 2. Bundesliga with 1. FC Magdeburg and Hamburger SV (0:1), for both of them it was also the first season in the 2. Bundesliga.
 For the 2018–19 season, "Derbystar" "Brillant APS" replaced Adidas "Torfabrik" as the official match ball of the 1st and 2. Bundesliga.

References

2018–19 in German football leagues
2018-19
Germ